The Omopterini are a tribe of moths in the family Erebidae.

Taxonomy
The tribe was split from the tribe Ophiusini (also in the subfamily Erebinae) after phylogenetic analysis showed that the New World genera were not the closest relatives of the other genera in the Ophiusini.

Genera

Acritogramma
Amolita
Bendisodes
Coenipeta
Coxina
Elousa
Epidromia
Eubolina
Euclystis
Euparthenos
Helia
Heteranassa
Itomia
Kakopoda
Lesmone
Matigramma
Metria
Pseudanthracia
Selenisa
Toxonprucha
Tyrissa
Zale
Zaleops

References

 
Moth tribes